Kyrksæterøra is the administrative center of the municipality of Heim in Trøndelag county, Norway. The village was known as the "white town of Hemnfjorden" at one time because there were only white houses. The villages of Hellandsjøen and Heim both lie to the north and the village of Vinjeøra lies to the south. Hemne Church is located in the village. Norwegian County Road 680 passes through the village. The newspaper Søvesten has been published in Kyrksæterøra since 1994.

At one time, there was a shoe factory, a shipyard, a lumber mill, and fish processing plant in the area. Kyrksæterøra was bombed during World War II, but there were no deaths and there was minimal damage. Nearby, the Nazis also had a large camp for Russian prisoners-of-war.

Name
The last part of the name (øra) is the articulated form of ør 'sandbank (at the mouth of a river)'. The first element is the name of the old farm Kyrksæter. The first element of this name is the genitive of kirkja 'church' (referring to the fact that the first church was built there). The last part is the old name Soðin or Soðvin, which is a compound of the river name Søo and vin 'meadow' or 'pasture'. The name of the river is derived from the verb sjóða 'seethe' or 'boil' (referring to the froth of the waterfalls in the river). The name was spelled Kirksæterøra before the early 20th century.

Notable residents
 Erik Hoftun (b. 1969), former football defender, 30 caps for Norway national football team

Media gallery

References

Villages in Trøndelag
Heim, Norway
World War II sites in Norway